Vultures is the debut album by the British-Canadian supergroup AxeWound, released on 2 October 2012. The first song, "Post Apocalyptic Party", was released on 1 May 2012, when group founder Matt Tuck unveiled the group, which along with the Bullet for My Valentine frontman features Cancer Bats vocalist Liam Cormier, former Glamour of the Kill guitarist Mike Kingswood, ex-Rise to Remain bassist Joe Copcutt and Pitchshifter drummer Jason Bowld. The second song from the album, "Cold", premiered on 29 May. Avenged Sevenfold guitarist Synyster Gates guested on the title track, contributing a guitar solo. The album was produced by Matt Tuck and mixed and mastered by Machine.

Track listing

Personnel
AxeWound
Matt Tuck – rhythm guitar, vocals, production
Liam Cormier – lead vocals
Mike Kingswood – lead guitar
Joe Copcutt – bass guitar
Jason Bowld – drums, percussion

Additional personnel
Synyster Gates – guitar solo on "Vultures"
Matt Bond – piano, strings on "Collide"
Martyn "Ginge" Ford – engineering
Machine – mixing, mastering

References

2012 debut albums
AxeWound albums